Buried Alive (also known as. Edgar Allan Poe's Buried Alive) is a 1990 horror film, directed by Gérard Kikoïne and based on the work of Edgar Allan Poe. It stars Robert Vaughn, Donald Pleasence and John Carradine. This film is considered to be Nia Long’s acting debut. The script was based on the works of Edgar Allan Poe. The film marks Carradine's final performance is dedicated to his memory.

Plot
At the Ravenscroft Institute, an all-girl school for juvenile delinquents, several girls go missing as they are assaulted by a man in a Ronald Reagan mask, who drags them to the basement of the school and immures them into darkened chambers to die a slow and agonizing death by way of entombment. Janet, a new teacher, arrives at the school and becomes a target of the killer.

Cast
 Robert Vaughn as Gary Julian
 Donald Pleasence as Dr. Schaeffer
 Karen Witter as Janet
 John Carradine as Jacob
 Ginger Lynn Allen as Debbie (as Ginger Allen)
 Nia Long as "Fingers"
 Arnold Vosloo as Ken Wade

Production
Buried Alive was John Carradine's final film, who died in 1988. Filming took place in the country of Botswana in South Africa.

Release
As with the other three Harry Alan Towers productions inspired by Poe, Buried Alive was released direct-to-video in the United States.

On March 15, 2011, MGM released the film on DVD-R format through its MGM Limited Edition program.

Reception
In a contemporary review, Variety described the film as browsing through several themes of Edgar Allan Poe with "dull results". The review noted the historical footnote of the film being the final film featuring Carradine, but noted that it disappoints as "there's only a few seconds of blurry Carradine footage." The review noted that audiences may be disappointed that Karen Witter remains clothed throughout the film, while noting that former porn actress Ginger Lynn "has one of her best mainstream jobs as a tough-talking inmate who proves to be an excellent screamer."

References

Footnotes

Sources

External links
 
 
 

1990 films
1990 horror films
American independent films
1990s English-language films
English-language South African films
South African independent films
Films based on short fiction
Films based on works by Edgar Allan Poe
1990 independent films
South African horror films
1990s American films